The following ships of the Indian Navy have been named INS Veer:

  is the lead vessel of her class of corvettes, currently in active service with the Indian Navy

Indian Navy ship names